Mackintosh Braun is a Portland, Oregon-based electropop group signed to Island Records / Chop Shop Records, a division of the Universal Music Group. The duo is composed of Ian Mackintosh and Ben Braun, who share song-writing and production duties. When performing live the outfit involve other musicians to fill out their sound, including at one point Ben's father Michael Braun, a long-time drummer for Hall & Oates who has also played on a few of the group's recordings.

According to an interview in Spinner, the group's influences range from The Beatles to the Midnight Juggernauts, and the band's public presence has led to profiles and features in Nylon, The Huffington Post, People, NPR Music and Consequence of Sound. The group's second album Where We Are was lauded by the Associated Press as one of 2010's most overlooked albums.

It was announced via Diffuser and their interview in The Huffington Post that Mackintosh Braun would be releasing their third album Arcadia in June 2015.
The album stream premiered June 15, 2015 with Vice Media, Inc. (Noisey) describing the album as "... a poppy gem, filled with soulful chillwave and dance tunes that are just in time for the summer. The album implores you to ride a wave of good vibes, punctuated by drums that remind you how great organic instrumentation can complement a synthesizer." Arcadia was released June 16 through Chop Shop Records / Island Records.

Clash announced in June 2017 that Ben Braun of Mackintosh Braun would be releasing a solo album entitled Silent Science on Diving Bell Records and premiered the first single "Prague". The album was released on October 6, 2017, and had tracks featured in both Riverdale (2017 TV series) and Dynasty (2017 TV series).

History
According to a profile in the ABC Music Lounge, Mackintosh Braun was formed largely by accident:

TV / Film Placements
Mackintosh Braun have received TV and film placement exposure, including on the television shows Chuck, How to Make It in America, The Carrie Diaries (TV series), Grey's Anatomy, Shades of Blue (TV series) and Gossip Girl.
The band's track "Frozen" was featured in the 2011 film The Beaver.
In February 2014 it was announced that their new single "Never Give In" would be featured in the film adaptation of Veronica Mars (film) and on the soundtrack, both being released in March.

Discography

Studio albums
The Sound (2007, Self-Published)
Where We Are (2010, Chop Shop/Atlantic Records)
Arcadia (2015, Chop Shop/Island Records)

Remixes

In October 2014 it was announced through an interview with Idolator that Mackintosh Braun were in the process of working on a remix for Lady Gaga. The remix was for a song called "I Can't Give You Anything But Love" which was the first single from Gaga and Tony Bennett's jazz standards album Cheek to Cheek (album) released in the same year. The remix ended up fizzling and was never released.

Cover Songs

Co-writes

References

Electronic music groups from Oregon
Musical groups from Portland, Oregon
2006 establishments in Oregon
Musical groups established in 2006